Kevin McLoughlin (born 1989) is a Gaelic footballer who plays for Knockmore and the Mayo county team.

He has started at right half forward in four All-Ireland football finals: the 2012 decider, which Mayo lost by 0-13 to 2-11 against Donegal and the 2013 decider, which Mayo lost by 1-14 to 2-12 against Dublin. The other two, in 2016 and 2017, were also lost to Dublin. McLoughlin scored three points for Dublin in the first.

McLoughlin played in the first Test for Ireland against Australia in the 2013 International Rules Series, scoring one goal.

He is a secondary school teacher at Rice College in Westport, County Mayo.

Honours
 Connacht Senior Football Championship (6): 2009, 2011, 2012, 2013, 2014, 2015, 2020, 2021
 FBD Connacht League (2): 2010, 2012
 Connacht Under-21 Football Championship (1): 2009

References

1988 births
Living people
Irish international rules football players
Irish schoolteachers
Mayo inter-county Gaelic footballers